The Guts may refer to:
 The Guts (novel), 2013 novel by Roddy Doyle
 The Guts, American band in which Geoff Useless performed vocals
 The Guts!, a series of eroge video games

See also
 Gut (disambiguation)
 Gut (surname), people so named
 Lower gastrointestinal tract or "the guts"